Derrick Andre Rodgers (born October 14, 1971) is a former American college and professional football player who was a linebacker in the National Football League (NFL) for eight seasons in the late 1990s and early 2000s.  Rodgers played college football for Arizona State University, and earned All-American honors.  A third-round pick in the 1997 NFL Draft, he played professionally for the Miami Dolphins and New Orleans Saints of the NFL.

Early years
Rodgers was born in Memphis, Tennessee.  He attended St. Augustine High School, a Roman Catholic school in New Orleans, Louisiana, where he played high school football for the St. Augustine Purple Knights.

College career
He received an athletic scholarship to attend Arizona State University, and played for the Arizona State Sun Devils football team.  As a senior in 1996, Rodgers was recognized as a consensus first-team All-American as a defensive lineman.

Professional career
In eight NFL seasons, he played in 116 regular season games, started 111 of them, and compiled 507 tackles, nine quarterback sacks and four interceptions.

References

1971 births
Living people
St. Augustine High School (New Orleans) alumni
All-American college football players
American football linebackers
Arizona State Sun Devils football players
Miami Dolphins players
New Orleans Saints players
People from Memphis, Tennessee